The Flood is a 1931 pre-Code American melodrama film directed by James Tinling from a story by John Thomas Neville. Sam Nelson was assistant director. Produced and distributed by Columbia Pictures, the film was released in the US on 28 February 1931.

Cast 
Eleanor Boardman as Joan Marshall
Monte Blue as David Bruce
Frank Sheridan as David Bruce, Sr.
David Newell as Randolph Bannister
William V. Mong as Colonel Marshall
Violet Barlowe as Emily
Eddie Tamblyn as Willy
Arthur Hoyt as Uncle George
Ethel Wales as Aunt Constance
Buddy Ray as Ray Jeff

Production 
Production for The Flood lasted from 10 December 1930 to 14 January 1931. The film's copyright was registered on 25 February 1931.

References

External links 
 
 

1931 films
1931 drama films
American black-and-white films
American drama films
Films directed by James Tinling
1930s English-language films
1930s American films